Milton Rutherford Reid (29 April 1917 – c. 1987) was an Indian-born British actor and professional wrestler. He was born in India, the son of a Scottish-born Customs and Excise inspector and an Indian woman. He wrestled in England under the name of The Mighty Chang.

Film career

As an actor, Reid was known for playing thugs, henchmen and brutes, typified by his role as Yen in the film Ferry to Hong Kong (1959) that starred Curd Jürgens and Orson Welles. He played the big pirate in Swiss Family Robinson (1960) and had a memorable role as the mute Mulatto in the Hammer film Captain Clegg (1962). Reid appeared in three James Bond films: as Dr. No's Guard in Dr. No (1962), as a temple guard in Casino Royale (1967), and as Sandor, Roger Moore's opponent in a roof top fight in The Spy Who Loved Me (1977). Reid also appeared as a henchman in the 1967 Bulldog Drummond film Deadlier Than the Male and as Eye Patch in the 1977 Bond spoof No. 1 of the Secret Service.

Reid attempted to secure the role of Oddjob in Goldfinger (1964). He challenged fellow professional wrestler Harold "Tosh Togo" Sakata to a wrestling match; the outcome of which would determine who would get the role. As Reid had already appeared in Dr. No, the producers decided to go with Sakata, and the wrestling match did not take place, though Reid's later Bond character of Sandor was Oddjob-esque.

He appeared briefly as a circus strongman in The Rolling Stones Rock and Roll Circus, which was filmed in 1968 but delayed for release until 1996. In the early 1970s he appeared as a bodyguard in a TV commercial for St Bruno pipe tobacco, a role which he reprised in a spoof advert for "Butch" tobacco in Kitten Kong, an episode of the BBC series The Goodies. Reid also appeared in a handful of cult horror movies including Dr. Phibes Rises Again and Terror, fantasy/adventure films such as The People That Time Forgot and Arabian Adventure, and several British sex films such as Come Play with Me and Adventures of a Private Eye. Additionally Reid accepted non-sexual roles in a couple of hardcore porn films including Arabian Knights, shot in London in 1979 and released by Color Climax.

Reid appeared in over 53 films and television programmes from 1953 to 1979. He travelled back to India where his mother and sister resided. Reid supposedly died of a heart attack in 1987, his son was still receiving written correspondence from him in 1986. His death is something of a mystery due to the conflicting dates of death and also because he died in relative obscurity in India.

Filmography

 Undercover Girl (1958) – Mac, thug with beard
The Camp on Blood Island (1958) – Japanese Executioner (uncredited)
Blood of the Vampire (1958) – Executioner
Ferry to Hong Kong (1959) – Yen, Sing-Up's Partner
Swiss Family Robinson (1960) – Big Pirate
The Terror of the Tongs (1961) – Guardian (uncredited)
Visa to Canton (1961) – Bodyguard
The Wonders of Aladdin (1961) – Omar
Captain Clegg (1962) – Mulatto
Dr. No (1962) – Dr.No's Guard (uncredited)
Panic (1963) – Dan
55 Days at Peking (1963) – Boxer (uncredited)
The Ten Gladiators (1963) – Baldhead Wrestler
A Stitch in Time (1963) – The Mighty Chang in Photograph (uncredited)
Desperate Mission (1965) – To-go
Deadlier Than the Male (1967) – Chang 
Casino Royale (1967) – Temple Guard (uncredited)
Berserk! (1967) – Strong Man
The Mini-Affair (1967) – Fisherman
Great Catherine (1968) – Henchman (uncredited)
The Assassination Bureau (1969) – Elevator victim Leonardi (uncredited)
Target: Harry (1969) – Kemal
The Best House in London (1969) – Henchman (uncredited)
Rekvijem (1970) – Officer
The Nameless Knight (1970) – Dev (uncredited)
The Blood on Satan's Claw (1971) – Dog Handler (uncredited)
Carry on Henry (1971) – Executioner (uncredited)
The Horsemen (1971) – Aqqul (uncredited)
Au Pair Girls (1972) – The Guard
Dr. Phibes Rises Again (1972) – Manservant – Cheng
The Return of the Pink Panther (1975) – Japanese Restaurant Owner
Adventures of a Private Eye (1978) – Bodyguard
Come Play with Me (1977) – Tough
The People That Time Forgot (1977) – Sabbala
The Spy Who Loved Me (1977) – Sandor
No. 1 of the Secret Service (1977) – Eye Patch
Terror (1978) – Club Bouncer
What's Up Superdoc! (1978) – Louie
Confessions from the David Galaxy Affair (1979) – Eddie
Arabian Adventure (1979) – Jinnee
Queen of the Blues (1979) – Ricky
Arabian Knights (1979) – Servant
Westcountry Tales (1981) – The Monster
Mard (1985) – Villain (uncredited)
Kala Dhanda Goray Log (1986) – (final film role)

References

Further reading

Keeping the British End Up: Four Decades of Saucy Cinema by Simon Sheridan (fourth edition) (Titan Publishing, London) (2011)

External links
MILTON REID "The Mighty Chang"
Milton Reid at Aveleyman

Indian people of Scottish descent
1917 births
1987 deaths
British actors
British male professional wrestlers
Indian male professional wrestlers
Indian emigrants to the United Kingdom